The House of Malaspina was a noble Italian family of Longobard origin that descended from Boniface I, through the Obertenghi line, that ruled Lunigiana from the 13th to the 14th centuries, and the marquisate of Massa and lordship of Carrara (which later became the Duchy of Massa and Carrara and at a later time the Principality of Massa and the Marquisate of Carrara) since the 14th century.

History 

The founder of the Malaspina family was Oberto I, who became the count of Luni in 945. Oberto I was appointed as the marquis of the March of Genoa under the Italian king Berengario II in 951 and he became a count palatine in 953.

Oberto I had two children; Oberto II, who inherited the title of count of Luni from his father, and Adalberto I, whose offspring founded the Pallavicino and the Cavalcabò families. Oberto II had four children; Bertha of Milan, the spouse of the King of Italy Arduino; Ugo, count of Milan; Albert Azzo I, count of Luni whose offspring founded the Este family branches of Hannover and Brunswick; and Oberto Obizzo I, progenitor of the lineage of the Malaspinas.

In 1004, Oberto Obizzo I fought beside his brother-in-law King Arduino against the Count Bishops of Luni: this was the first of many conflicts between the family and the governors of the Roman-founded city.

The surname Malaspina means "bad thorn" or "ill-willed thorn" in Italian; some historians believe the surname originated in the time of Ancus Marcius as some paintings in the halls of castle of Fosdinovo may suggest. Other historians believe the name may have originated from a legend regarding the death of an enemy, King Merovingio Teodeberto I. The legend, which is narrated on five sandstone tiles at the entry gate of the Malaspina castle of Godiasco, tells how the king was killed with a thorn. Others believe the name originated from the remarkably bad attitude of Albert Malaspina or some of his relatives held with others.

Albert Malaspina extended the family's possessions towards the Apennine Mountains near Lunigiana, starting a conflict with Genoa and the Bishops of Luni. The 1124 peace treaty of Lucca references the division of goods between the descendants of Oberto Obizzo I, who in time gave birth to several European noble families; Brunswick, Estens, Pallavicino and the marquises of Massa, Sardinia and Corsica, as well as the Malaspinas.

Albert's son, the Marquis Obizzo I Malaspina (d. 1185), initially fought against Frederick Barbarossa the Holy Roman Emperor, supporting rioting commoners. After the emperor took control of the conflict, Obizzo changed sides, supporting him in his fight against Milan in 1157. The emperor rewarded Obizzo, granting him the right to rule over the territories of Liguria, Lunigiana, Lombardy and Emilia. In 1176, after escorting Barbarossa to Pavia, Obizzo surprised him by deciding to ally with the Lombard league and attacking the Emperor's armies. Because of Obizzo's betrayal, Frederick Barbarossa was defeated in the battle of Legnano. In the peace treaty of Costanza, the emperor forgave Obizzo and re-confirmed Obizzo's right to rule over the land he was given. Both the Battle of Legnano and the Peace of Costanza are represented in paintings conserved in the hall of Fosdinovo castle and were realized by Gaetano Bianchi at the end of the 19th century.

Obizzo I had two sons Obizzo II Malaspina—also known as Obizzone—and Moroello I Malaspina. The descendants of Obizzo II founded the Spino secco ("dried thorn") branch of the family while the descendants of Moroello I founded the Spino Fiorito ("bloomed thorn") branch of the family (1221). Obizzo II had a son called Conrad I Malaspina, who was defined by Dante Alighieri as "the Old or The Ancient" due to his fame and long-living legacy; Conrad I is considered to be the first exponent of the Spino Secco branch. He obtained all of the territories over the right bank of the Magra river and the territories of Villafranca on the left bank of the Magra river.
Conrad I Malaspina had four children; Manfredi Malaspina, Moroello of Mulazzo, Frederick of Villafranca, and Albert Malaspina.

Manfredi Malaspina had a son named Moroello "Vapor of Valdimagra", who was a good friend of Dante Alighieri; because of his close friendship with Manfredi and the kindness he was shown during his exile, Alighieri paid homage to the Malaspina family in the "Purgatory" section of his epic poem Divine Comedy. Moroello had a son named Franceschino Malaspina, who took part in the wars between Guelfs and Ghibellines, and is known to have hosted Dante Alighieri several times during his exile in Lunigiana, nominating him as his personal attorney in the difficult peace negotiations with the Bishop of Luni, Antonio Da Camilla. These negotiations resulted in the peace of Castelnuovo in 1306. Frederick of Villafranca (Brother of Conrad Malaspina The Old) had two sons; Obizzino Malaspina and Conrad Malaspina the Young, to whom Dante expressed his gratitude for the Malaspina family in the 8th canto of "Purgatory".

Moroello I Malaspina had a son named Guglielmo Malaspina, whose son Obizzino Malaspina is considered to be the true progenitor of the Spino Fiorito branch of the family. He received all of the territories on the left bank of the Magra river. Obizzino married Caterina Cattaneo and had three heirs; Bernabò Malaspina, Isnardo Malaspina, and Albert Malaspina. Isnardo married Cubina D'este, who gave birth to Gabriele I Malaspina and Azzolino Malaspina; the latter had three children; Spinetta Malaspina—also known as The Great, who in 1340 purchased the feud of Fosdinovo without having any legitimate offspring; Isnardo; and Azzolino whose offspring would assume the title of Marquess of Fosdinovo (1355).

The division of lands between the ever-increasing heirs brought about a shattering of the Dominion of the family into smaller feuds. The Malaspinas sometimes supported the Ghibelline faction and sometimes the Guelf faction. While supporting the Guelfs, Obizzino took part in the conflicts of the Lombards against the Hohenstaufen. Obizzino, alongside Morroello of the Malaspinas of Giovagallo, commanded the Guelf army that defended Florence against Henry VII of Luxembourg. The Ghibelline faction defending emperor Henry VII was also led by a household member; Spinetta Malaspina, also known as the Great.

The Malaspina family also controlled land in the north of Genoa around the four provinces area in the valleys of the Trebbia and Staffora rivers. The lordships in the Lunigiana and in the north of Genoa (also called Lombarda) were soon fragmented due to the adoption of the Longobard Right, which required an equal division of assets, including feuds, between male sons. Some members of the Malaspina family held a part of the Giudicato of Lugodoro (Giudicato di Torres) in the 13th and 14th centuries but most relevantly from the 15th to the 18th centuries, the branch of the Cybo-Malaspina governed the independent marquisate of Massa and the participants of Carrara, then known as the Duchy of Massa and Carrara). The family's Sardinian possessions were: the castle of Serravalle (Bosa) with the curation of Planargia and Costa De Addess; and the castle of Osilo with the curation of Montes, Figulinas and Coros. Members of the family also had the right to the title of princes of San Colombano.

Dante's homage 
In the eighth canto of Purgatory, Dante Alighieri celebrates the Malaspina's courtly values, especially those of liberality and hospitality that were well known throughout Europe.

"Oh!" said I then to him, "I 've never beenin your domains, but where throughout all Europedwelleth a man who knows them not? The famewhich honoreth your house, proclaims its lords,proclaims its district, so that even heknows of them, who hath never been there yet.I swear to you, so may I go on high,that of the glorious use of purse and swordyour honored race doth not despoil itself.(Divine Comedy, Purgatory, Dante Alighieri, 8th Canto, Vv. 121–129)

Origins 

The Malaspinas were a marchesal branch descending from the Obertenghi family, whose originator was Oberto I (Otbert or Odebertus), who around the middle of the 10th century became count palatine (the count of the sacred palace of Pavia and absolute judiciary authority of the kingdom), and from 951 he also became marquis of Milan and Count of Luni, as well as of the marquisate of Obertenga, as he called it), in the western part of Liguria, which was made up of the committees of Milan, Genoa, Tortona, Bobbio, Luni and other bordering territories.

This vast territory was fragmented both because the hereditary divisions such as the majorat were not yet valid and because of conflicting relationships with other families, including the Fieschi, Spinola, Doria and others, and because of pressure coming from the birthing communes of Milan, Genoa, Piacenza, Tortona, Pavia and Bobbio. Oberto I founded the house through his descendants Oberto II, Oberto Obizzo I, Albert I, Oberto Obizzo II and Albert I Malaspina (d. 1140).

In 1164, Albert's son Obizzo I (the great) (d. 1185) had his feudal rights confirmed by Emperor Frederick I and was also nominated Imperial Vassal. His feuds included parts of the modern-day Liguria (Tigullio, Cinque Terre and Levanto sul mare—which he acquired from Genoa and the Fieschi; the territories of the Lunigiana, Garfagnana and the valleys of the Trebbia River up to Torriglia); the Val d'Aveto (until Santo Stefano d'Aveto) and Staffora located in the Oltrepò); as well as Lombardy (Val Bormida and Oltregiogo).

In 1220, of Obizzo I's many heirs, only Conrad Malaspina the Old and Obizzino Malaspina were alive; their feudal rights were re-confirmed by the emperor although the territories were slightly reduced due to Piacenza's prevalent influence. In 1221, Conrad and Obizzino divided their lordships equally. Conrad ruled over the Lunigiana territories located on the west bank of the Magra River and Val Trebbia in Lombardy, giving birth to the Spino Secco branch, while Obizzino ruled over the Lunigiana territories located on the east bank of the Magra River and Valle Staffora in Lombardy, giving birth to the Spino Fiorito branch of the family.

Essential genealogy 
Oberto I
Oberto II
Oberto Obizzo I
Albert I
Obizzo II
Albert "The Malaspina", forefather of the Malaspina
Obizzo Malaspina
Obizzone
Conrad I Malaspina, forefather of the Spino Secco branch of the family
Morello
Guglielmo
Opizzo Malaspina, Forefather of the Spino Fiorito branch of the family

Spino Secco branch

In 1266, four sub-branches were formed from the descendants of Conrad Malaspina (The Old) remembered by Dante Alighieri in the Divine Comedy.

Malaspina of Mulazzo 

The origin of this sub-branch is attributed to Moroello Malaspina (d. 1284), who possessed the Castle of Mulazzo in Lunigiana—the main castle of the Spino Secco branch—and feuds in Val Trebbia surrounding Ottone, He also had some influence over the family's dominions in Sardinia. This sub-branch was the first to be generated from the Spino Secco; it retained possession of the marquisate of Mulazzo until the abolition of feudalism. The branch was extinguished in 1810 with the death of marquis Alessandro Malaspina, a renowned politician, explorer and navigator.

The marquisate, ruling from 1266 to 1797, was recognized as an imperial feud as soon as 1164; it expanded with several acquisitions of land in Pozzo, Montereggio, Montarese, Castagnetoli (from 1746), Calice, Veppo and Madrignano; the latter three territories were administered by the cadets of the Mulazzo sub-branch from 1710 to 1772, and due to debts were sold to the Grand Duke of Tuscany.
 
In the 16th century, the branches of Madrignano (1523–1634) and Montereggio (1523–1646) momentarily detached from the main Mulazzo branch. The feud of Mulazzo, starting from 1473, was alternately governed by the "Malaspina del Castello" and the "Malaspina del Palazzo" until 1776. The direct male bloodline was extinguished by the famous explorer Alessandro Malaspina. The ruling marquises are presented below.
The main sub-branches deriving from the Malaspinas of Mulazzo were:
 Malaspina of Cariseto and Godano, from Cariseto a fraction of Cerignale in Val Trebbia; their forefather was Antonio (d. 1477), son of Antonio of Mulazzo. This branch was extinguished in the span of two generations: the marquisate of Cariseto was acquired by the Fieschi in 1540 and subsequently by the Doria.
 Malaspina of Santo Stefano, from Santo Stefano d'Aveto, in Val Trebbia; their forefather was Ghisello I (d. 1475), son of Antonio of Mulazzo. In 1495 the marquisate of Santo Stefano was sold to the Fieschi, only retaining the feuds of Godano and Bolano, both located in val di Vara between Lunigiana and Val Trebbia. The branch was extinguished in the 17th century and their feuds were left to the main branch of Mulazzo.
 Malaspina of Edifizi, in Edifizi a fraction of Ferriere in val Nure, their forefather was Pietro, son of Ghisello I of Santo Stefano, the branch was extinguished in 1624.
 Malaspina of Casanova (from a Casanova probably near Ottone); their forefather was Antonio, a bastard son of Barnabò of Mulazzo. The branch was extinguished in the 18th century after having sold their feud to the Doria in the 16th century.
 Malaspina of Croce (from Croce Fieschi in the Ligurian Apennines).Their feud was sold to the Fieschi in 1504.
 Malaspina of Fabbrica, from Fabbrica a fraction of Ottone (not to be mistaken with Fabbrica Curone of which the Malaspina of Varzi was the marquis). Their forefather was Moroello, who was either the son of Bernabò or of Galeazzo of Mulazzo. They sold their feud in 1540 to the Fieschi and survived to the end of the feudalism. The branch is still living today.
 Malaspina of Ottone, from Ottone in Val Trebbia. Their forefather was Giovanni, who was either the son of Bernabò or of Galeazzo of Mulazzo. They sold their feud in 1540 to the Fieschie and the branch was extinguished at the beginning of the 19th century.
 Malaspina of Orezzoli, from Orezzoli, a fraction of Ottone. Their forefather was Galeazzo, son of Giovanni of Ottone. They had a considerable ramification process; their main branch was extinguished in the 18th century but the bloodline survived in some sub-branches. From one of these sub-branches, native to Bobbio, derived via adoption the branch of the Malaspina-Della Chiesa, marquises of Volpedo and of Carbonara.
 Malaspina of Frassi, from Frassia fraction of Ottone. Their forefather was Giovanni, son of Galeazzo of Orezzoli. The bloodline still exists today through many sub-branches. They sold their feud in 1656 to the Doria.
 Malaspina of Madrignano, an independent branch that started in 1355 with Azzone as its forefather. The branch was extinguished until 1631 but was later revived from 1710 to 1772 with the Consignori of Mulazzo. The ruling marquises are presented below.

Malaspina of Castevoli 
An autonomous branch of the family starting from the 15th century with Azzone of Antonio of Mulazzo as its forefather. This branch possessed the feuds of Stadomelli, Cavanella and had some ruling authority over Villafranca. Its main representatives were Thomas II (d. 1603) and his son Francesco (d. 1649). The main branch went extinct in 1759 and with imperial approval, the feuds were unified with Villafranca (1796). In 1794, some revolts against the authoritarian regime of Thomas III started. In 1757, part of the feud was acquired by the Mulazzo branch. The ruling marquises are presented below.

Malaspina of Giovagallo 
The forefather of this branch was Manfredo, son of Conrad Malaspina The Old, around 1260. They possessed the castle of Giovagallo (Tresana) and some surrounding land. The branch went extinct in 1365 and their feuds were inherited by the Villafranca branch. Most of the marquisate was absorbed by the marquisate of Tresana.

Malaspina of Villafranca 
Their forefather was Frederick, son of Conrad Malaspina The Old; they ruled over the castle of Malnido as well as Villafranca in Lunigiana and the surrounding lands. The branch was greatly weakened and impoverished due to many hereditary divisions, wars and the loss of numerous territories in the valleys close to the river Vara, Auella and Taverone. In the 16th century they were taken under the protection of Modena and thanks to their loyalty, with the May 3, 1726, decree, the duke Rinaldo d'Este of Modena gave them the name "Malaspina Estensi". Their newly formed dominion included Garbugliaga, Beverino, Villa, Rocchetta di Vara, and the castles of Virgoletta and Malnido in Villafranca, where they ruled together with the consignori of the Castevoli branch. The ruling marquises are presented below.
The branch expanded efficiently, surviving after the end of feudalism and many co-branches still exist. Some of them had their own rulers as well as a separate identity. These include:
 Malaspina of Cremolino, from Cremolino in Monferrato; their forefather was Thomas I (1361), son of Frederick of Villafranca and of Agnese del Bosco, a blood relative of the Aleramica from which derived all of the family's feuds, including the consignoria over the city of Ovada. The branch went extinct in the 16th century.
 Malaspina of Lusuolo, from Lusuolo a fraction of Mulazzo in Lunigiana. Their forefather was Azzone (died in 1364), son of Opizzino of Villafranca; he inherited the feuds of the Malaspina of Giovagallo that was already extinct. This branch went extinct in the 17th century after selling their feuds to the grand-duke of Tuscany.
Malaspina of Podenzana from Podenzana in Lunigiana, whose forefather was Leonardo, son of Gian Spinetta of Lusuolo in 1536. During the Spanish war of succession, Alexander became the imperial governor of Aulla, greatly weakening the powers of the families of Genoa that had the right to rule over those territories since 1543. Refusing to pledge his loyalty to the king of Spain, Alexander's castle was demolished in 1706. In 1710, he regained the right to rule over the territories as the marquis of Aulla, purchasing the feud from the emperor at the price of 30.000 fiorini. In 1794, the branch inherited part of Licciana. They also possessed Montedivalli, Amola and a quarter of the feud of Monti. The branch went extinct in the 18th century. The ruling marquises are presented below.
 Malaspina of Tresana, from Tresana in Lunigiana. Their forefather was Opizzino, son of Giovanni Jacopo of Lusuolo, The branch went extinct with Guglielmo in 1652.
 Malaspina of Licciana, from Licciana Nardi in Lunigiana; their forefather was Gian Spinetta, son of Giovanni Spinetta of Villafranca> They became an independent branch in 1535 and ruled of the feud of Licciana. Their marquisate also had influence over Panicale, Monti, Piancastelli, Solaro, Bigliolo, Catanasco, Mulesano and Amola. Ferdinando, in the attempt to ask for Spanish protection, was killed during a riot in 1611. In 1778 the branch was put under the protection of Modena and in 1783 the family inherited in 1783 a part of the feud of Bastia. The branch went extinct at the end of the 18th century; after the death of Ignazio, the feud was acquired by the Podenzana branch (1795). The ruling marquises are presented below.
 Malaspina of Bastia, from Bastia, a fraction of Licciana Nardi; their forefather was Fioramonte II, son of Gian Spinetta di Licciana (d. 1528). The line became independent in 1535. During the 17th century, the feud was disgraced by the criminal activities of Nestore, the younger brother of the marquis Carlo; his criminal activity ended only after his death, which was caused by a violent popular revolt. Nestore completely disregarded the intervention of the grand duchy of Tuscany. In 1704 the feud became a Tuscan estate, gaining protection but having to be ruled by Florence officials. The marquee Anna, consort of the marquis Giovanni, was renowned in the territory as a woman of unmatched beauty; she was invited to Versailles in hopes of making her Luigi XV's favourite courtesan, replacing Pompadour. She failed in her efforts and came back to the feud with only a modest sum of money in compensation granted by the king. The line became extinct in 1783, leaving the feud to the line of Ponte Bosio. The ruling marquises are presented below.
 Malaspina of Terrarossa, from Terrarossa, a fraction of Licciana Nardi; their forefather was Fabrizio, son of Fioramonte of Bastia, who sold his feud to the Grand-Duke of Tuscany in 1617. This branch was extinguished after only two generations.
 Malaspina of Ponte Bosio, from Pontebosio, a fraction of Licciana Nardi; their forefather was Ludovico I, the abiotic grandson of Fioramonte of Bastia. This branch became the sovereign branch in 1631, receiving the official imperial investiture in 1639. They inherited the feud of Bastia in 1783 and in 1794 part of the feud of Licciana. They survived the end of feudalism but went extinct in the 19th century. The ruling marquises are presented below.
 Malaspina of Monti from Monti, a fraction of Licciana Nardi; their forefather was Moroello (1535–1575), son of Gian Spinetta of Licciana. This line went extinct in two generations with Orazio (1575–1585).
 Malaspina of Suvero, from Suvero, a fraction of Rocchetta di Vara, a province of Spezia on the borders of Lunigiana; their forefather was Rinaldo (1535), son of Gian Spinetta II of Licciana. This branch inherited Monti, which was later sold in 1664 to the Podenzana branch of the family The branch survived the end of feudalism and still exists today. An outstanding representative of the branch was Torquato (d. 1594), who favoured philanthropic initiatives and constructed a "monte frumentario" to prevent famines. After the hereditary war between Rinaldo II and Spinetta of the Olivola branch (1627), the imperial feud was at peace until the Spanish invasion of 1733, which destroyed the family's castle. The ruling marquises are presented below.

Malaspina of Pregòla 
This branch's forefather was Alberto (d. 1298), son of Conrad Malaspina (The Old). They inherited the feud of Pregòla—a fraction of Brallo di Pregola—and vast territory on the left side of the Val Trebbia; the river divided their feuds from the ones owned by the branch of Mulazzo. They also owned some territories near Bobbio. In 1304 Corradino Malaspina, the lord of the castle of Carana (Corte Brugnatella), in agreement with Visconte Pallavicino and the abbot of Bobbio, Guido took control over Bobbio, transformed it into a lordship and built its current castle. In 1341 the Visconti Milan took control of Bobbio and of the Brugnatella court, stripping the Malaspina of the castle of Carana and destroying the famous Castello Nero, a black castle famous for the unusual stones used to build it. After 1347, when Corradino died, the feud was distributed between his heirs but in 1361 they had to give it to the Visconti family. in 1436 it was given to the Dal Verme family, who had become counts of Bobbio and Voghera. The Malaspinas also lost control over the ancient church of San Cristoforo in the Valle del Carlone. The only territory they still owned was Dezza, which was later given to the Malaspina of Pregòla. The branch endured a division in 1347, from which the feuds of Prato (a fraction of Cantalupo Ligure, in Val Borbera, near Val Trebbia) and of Corte Brugnatella, which both had a short history. In another division in 1453 the four quartieri were separated from the feud of Pergola; each of the estates was given to a distinct branch of the family. These branches were:

 Malaspina of Vezimo, from Vezimo, a fraction of Zerba in Val Trebbia. They went extinct at the end of the 16th century.
 Malaspina of Pei and Isola from Pei, a fraction of Zerba; and Isola, a currently abandoned town in the fraction of Brallo di Pregola. The main branch went extinct in the 17th century but it is plausible that some descendants of the family survive between the Malaspinas currently living in the area, whose genealogy is still unknown.
 Malaspina of Alpe and Artana from Alpe, a fraction of Gorreto; and Artana, a fraction of Ottone. This line went extinct in the 17th century.
 Malaspina of Pregòla, Campi and Zerba from Zerba and Campi, a fraction of Ottone. They originated the branch, which later re-acquired a majority of the main feud and regained the title of Marques of Pregòla, which are still remembered today during a town celebration called "Sfilata Medioevale in Costume di Bobbio", which is held every November. Thanks to marquis Oliviero, in 1541 they obtained the investiture as an imperial feud and remained so despite continuous threats of invasion by the Savoia until the end of feudalism in Italy (1797). The last marquis ruling the feud was Baldassarre, who had strong pressure coming from the court of Tourin to renounce to his feudal rights. Because of hereditary distress the feud had fostered many family branches as well as the marquises of Pallavicino and Cabella, who with Gerolamo had usurped portions of the Malaspinian feud in 1660. In 1782 Gian Galeazzo Malaspina, the marquis of Santa Margherita; Antonio Giuseppe Malaspina, marquis of Orezzoli; heirs of Conrad Malaspina of Pregòla whose widowed wife Maria Teresa Farnese dal Pozzo in 1777 had become part of the Savoia; as well as Giovan Carlo Spinola Pallavicino, claimed their feudal rights in the court of Vienna regarding the recent annexations by the Savoia, asking for intervention from the Emperor. The direct line survived the end of feudalism and still remains a branch of the family. The line emigrated to Greece and later to the United States.

Spino Fiorito branch

in 1275, the son and three grandchildren of the forefather of the branch, Obizzo Malaspina also known as Obizzino, created four other sub-branches of the family.

Malaspina of Varzi 
Their forefather was Azzolino, Obizzinos grandson and son of Isnardo, who had already died before the division in 1275. With his brother Gabriele, Azzolino inherited a third of the estates of his grandfather Obizzino, some of which were in Lunigiana and some in Lombardy. After some time, in agreement with his brother, Azzolino took full control of the Lombardy feuds, mostly located in the Staffora valley surrounding Varzi. The Marquisate of Varzi was divided between Azzolino's three sons; the sub-branch of Isnardo, which ruled over Menconico, went extinct in the 15th century but the other two branches survived:
 Malaspina of Fabbrica, from Fabbrica Curone in a valley that borders with Staffora valley, had Obizzo as their forefather, Azzolino's son. They went extinct at the end of the 19th century after they had become Sforza-Malaspina.
 Malaspina of Varzi (first-born righteous branch); this branch went extinct in the 19th century after having created many ramifications and lost control over the marquisate. It is plausible that there could still be some heirs of the line between the many Malaspinas living in the Staffora valley to this day. From the Varzi branch other two branches were created:
 Malaspina of Santa Margherita, from Santa Margherita, a fraction of Santa Margherita di Staffora; their forefather was Cristoforo, who died after 1420. They went extinct in 1821.
 Malaspina of Casanova, from Casanova Staffora, a fraction of Santa Margherita di Staffora. Their forefather was Baldassarre son of Bernabò di Varzi. They generated another sub-branch but went extinct in the 17th century.
 Malaspina of Bagnaria, from Bagnaria, of which they only had the nominal 'ruling title'. Their forefather was Bernabò son of Bernabò di Varzi. They went extinct in the 17th century.

Malaspina of Fivizzano 

This branch's forefather was Gabriele, Obizzino's grandson and Isnardo's son, who died before the division of the feuds in 1275. Gabriele ruled over a third of the family's estates alongside his brother Azzolino; some feuds were in Lunigiana and some in Lombardy; thanks to a political agreement between him and Azzollino, Gabriele took control of the feuds in Lunigiana, which consisted of the castle of Verrucola in Fivizzano and the bordering territories in eastern Lunigiana. Gabriele had three children; Isnardo's family went extinct in the 15th century, leaving Fivizzano to the Republic of Florence, with which the family were allied. This event determined the future, creating the strong influence Florence had over Lunigiana and the bordering territories. The famous Lunigiana Granducale, which fought for supremacy with the Malaspinian dominium as well as the one of Modena. Spinetta Malaspina pledged his loyalty to Verona; by doing so he was awarded the feud of Fosdinovo. Spinetta had no natural heirs so his bloodline went extinct with his sons; Azzolino's descendants were rewarded with the feud of Fosdinovo and generated the line of Malaspina of Fosdinovo, who were imperial vicars in Italy from whom Antonio Alberico I Malaspina descended. Because Antonio was the marquis of Fosdinovo, he obtained the feud of Massa in 1441. His son, Giacomo I Malaspina (d. 1481), succeeded his father and added to the lordship of Massa the feud of Carrara and its surrounding territories. Giacomo's son, Alberico, banished his brother Francesco and Francesco's offspring, depriving them of all succession rights and leaving his daughter Ricciarda as his sole heir. Ricciarda married Lorenzo Cibo, from which descended the Cybo-Malaspina, the new duchess of Massa and Carrara.

This branch of the family generated several other sub-branches, including:
 Malaspina of Sannazzaro from Sannazzaro de' Burgondi near Pavia; their forefather was Francesco, the son of Giacomo I of Massa, who had been invested as the rightful ruler of the feud by the Sannazzaro in 1466. They went extinct in 1835 with Luigi, an outstanding citizen of Pavia, in which he had a prominent political and social role.

Malaspina of Fosdinovo 

This branch's forefather was the son of Azzolino, Galeotto, who died in 1367. In 1340, Spinetta Malaspina consolidated the family's power over its estates, granting them the lordship for the following centuries. The marquisate of Fosdinovo became sovereignly autonomous in 1367, engulfing the territories of Viano, Castel dell'Aquila, Gragnola (1646), Cortila, Pulica, Giucano, Ponzanello, Tendola, Marciaso and Posterla, Caniparola. Gabriele, son of Antonio Alberico I of Fosdinovo, took control of the feud of Fosdinovo, leaving the other estates to his siblings.

In 1529 the hereditary status of imperial Vicary was recognised to him and his feuds. In 1666 the emperor granted the branch the right to produce its own currency. The last sovereign marquis was Carlo Emanuele, who was in favour of abolishing the imperial feuds in Italy; he agreed with the Napoleonic edict of 2 July 1797 and renounced his feuds. The Torrigiani-Malaspina family still owns the Castle Fosdinovese. The ruling marquises are presented below.
 Malaspina of Olivola, from Olivola, a fraction of Aulla; their forefather was Lazzaro, son of Giovanni Battista of Fosdinovo and nephew of Gabriele, who had taken control of the feud of Olivola after the assassination of the original heirs of the main branch. The marquisate also possessed Pallerone (1572), Bibola, Bigliolo, Agnino, Quercia, Saracco and Vaccareccia. In 1569 their feud was absorbed by the Grand Duchy of Tuscany. This branch went extinct in the 19th century. The ruling marquises are presented below.
 Malaspina of Verona; their forefather was Spinetta, son of Antonio Alberico I of Fosdinovo, who gave up his feudal rights but had many estates in Verona. This branch became part of Verona's nobility in 1406 and acquired the marchional title with imperial placet on 13 April 1638, which was then re-confirmed on 7 January 1821. They went extinct in the 20th century.
 Malaspina of Gragnola, from Gragnola a fraction of Fivizzano; their forefather was Leonardo, brother of Spinetta the Great. They went extinct with Leonardo II (d. 1419) after two generations but their feud was passed down to the marquis of Fosdinovo, which went extinct in 1642. The ruling marquises are presented below.

Malaspina of Olivola 
Their forefather was Francesco, son of Bernabò and grandson of Obizzino who, after the division of 1275, inherited land in Lunigiana (the castle of Olivola, in a fraction of Aulla) and Lombardy, including the castle of Pizzocorno, a fraction of Ponte Nizza. The heirs of the main branch were assassinated in 1413 in the castle of Olivola; their feuds were divided between the Fosdinovo and Godiasco branches of the family.
Olivola was given to the line of Gragnola; after the extinction of the line, it was given to Alberico I of Fosdinovo and his son Gabriele IV (d. 1485), who left it to his son Giovan Battista. The feud was later inherited by Lazzaro, who in 1525 created an independent line, which survived until the abolition of the imperial feuds in 1797. The ruling marquises are presented below.

Malaspina of Godiasco 
The forefather of this branch was Alberto, son of Obizzino, who in the division of 1275 with his grandchildren had feuds in both Lunigiana and Lombardy, mainly close to the castle of Filattiera. They were initially called Malaspina of Filattiera; this title was kept by the first generation only. They also had a castle in Oramala—a fraction of Val di Nizza, and later acquired control over the Borgo of Godiasco and set it as their centre of power. In 1743 the province of Bobbio was established under the marquisate of Bobbio from 1516; the Savoia and the mandate of Varzi delimitated their territories. The five main sub-branches of the family were created by Nicolò (also known as Marchesotto) the son of Alberto, and his five children; they all had feuds in Lunigiana and in the marquisate of Godiasco:

 Malaspina of Castiglione and Casalasco from Castiglione del Terziere, a fraction of Bagnone in Lunigiana, and from Casalasco, a fraction of Val di Nizza in the Oltrepò Pavese; their forefather was Franceschino, son of Marchesotto who was also known as The soldier. They went extinct in three generations; the feud of Castiglione went to Florence and that of Casalasco went to the Malaspina of Oramala.
 Malaspina of Bagnone and Valverde from Bagnone in Lunigiana and Valverde in the Oltrepò Pavese; their forefather was Antonio, son of Marchesotto. Antonio's children divided their estates equally; Bagnone was given to Riccardo and was later sold by his grandchildren to Florence. His bloodline went extinct in 1987. The bloodline of Cardinal Aragonio Malaspina Bartolelli lives on; its last heir is still alive in the Marca Anconetana. Valverde was given to Antonio, whose bloodline probably continued in the Oltrepò.
 Malaspina of Treschietto and Piumesana from Treschietto, a fraction of Bagnone in Lunigiana; and from Piumesana, a fraction of Godiasco in the Oltrepò Pavese; their forefather was Giovanni, son of Marchesotto. In 1698 they sold Treschietto and their lordship over Piumesana to the Grand-Duke of Tuscany. The consignoria on Godiasco was reduced significantly. They went extinct in the 19th century.
 Malaspina of Filattiera and Cella from Filattiera in Lunigiana and Cella, a fraction of Varzi in the Oltrepò Pavese; their forefather was Obizzino, son of Marchesotto. In 1514 Bernabò, rebelled against the Sforza, and was executed in Voghera. The feud of Cella was confiscated; his son Manfredi sold Filattiera to the Grand-Duke of Tuscany. They went extinct in the 18th century.
 Malaspina of Malgrate and Oramala from Malgrate, a fraction of Villafranca in Lunigiana; and from Oramala, a fraction of Val di Nizza in the Oltrepò Pavese. Their forefather was Bernabò, son of Marchesotto. This is one of the few branches of the family, alongside the one of Fosdinovo, that never diminished its power over time; it acquired almost full control of the marquisates of Godiasco, Pozzol Groppo and Fortunago they also acquired substantial control over many of the other Malaspinian feuds of the Oltrepò. This branch was later called Malaspina of Godiasco-Pozzol Groppo and Fortunago. They went extinct in the 19th century. The ruling marquises are presented below.
 Malaspina of Sagliano from Sagliano Crenna, a fraction of Varzi; their forefather was Azzo, son of Nicolò of Oramala and Malgrate. This branch went extinct in the 18th century.

Other branches 

 Malaspina of Ascoli Piceno, from Ascoli Piceno in Marche; the feud was later inherited by the Malatesta but the Sforza later gave it back to the Malaspina, who held it until 1502 when it was acquired by the papacy.
 Malaspina of Grondona; they only held the feud of Grondona until the end of feudalism.
 Sorce-Malaspina; their forefather was the marquis of Olivola, Giuseppe Massimiliano Malaspina (1700 – 1 November 1758). Alberico was born from Giuseppe's union with Maria Teresa Malaspina, (1703 – Pisa, 3 November 1770) (d. 1789); he married Maria Migliore in Palermo. The daughter of Maria Angelica Malaspina married Don Antonino Sorce, the heir of a rich family of Mussomeli, giving origin to the Sorce-Malaspina branch of the family. In 1770, their son Salvatore Sorce-Malaspina was born; with his wife Antonina Padronaggio he had these children:

 Antonino Sorce Malaspina (born in 1793);
 Vincenzo Sorce Malaspina (born in 1806), married with Donna Gaetana Sorce;
 Maria Angelica Sorce Malaspina (born in 1801);
 Maria Carmela Sorce Malaspina (born in 1800). The line is currently still alive thanks to the heirs of Giuseppe Mistretta, born from Cavalier Antonino and Donna Stefanina Mistretta.

Family members of unknown lines 
Ricordano Malaspina (also known as Malespini) (c. 1200 – 1281) – a historiographer from Florence. He wrote a book about the history of Florence (Istoria Fiorentina) in Italian, which was completed after his death by his grandson Giaccotto. After the battle of Montaperti (1260) he was exiled to Rome and returned to Florence after the battle of Benevento in 1266.
Giacotto Malaspina, who documented Florence's history until 1286.
Saba Malaspina, the secretary of Pope John XXI; he wrote the history of Sicily (Rerum sicularum, 1250–76) from a Guelph's point of view.

Marquesses of Malaspina

House of Malaspina

Rulers of Lunigiana under Malaspina rule

Table of rulers

Malaspina branches at mid-18th century
 Spino Secco:

 Mulazzo, Montereggio and Castagnetoli (1746): Carlo Moroello 1746–74, Tuscan protectorate
 Calice, Veppo, Madrignano, Mulazzo (1710): Gian Cristoforo 1710–63; feud given to Tuscany in 1772
 Suvero, Monti: Rinaldo III 1736–70
 Orezzoli, Volpedo: Marco Antonio 1691–52 (side-branch), sold to the Savoia
 Fabbrica di Ottone (side-branch), sold to the Savoia
 Ottone (side-branch), sold to the Savoia
 Frassi (side-branch), sold to the Savoia
 Villafranca, Virgoletta, Garbugliaga, Beverone: Federico III Malaspina Estense 1722–86; Modena feud
 Castevoli, Cavanella, Stadomelli: Opizzone Paolo 1744–59, given to the Villafranca branch
 Licciana, Monti, Panicale, Bigliolo: Cornelio 1741–78; extinct in 1794 later annexed by the Villafranca branch
 Bastia, Varano, Monti: Giovanni 1740–83, annexed by Ponte Bosio
 Ponte Bosio, Monti: Giulio 1748–68, from 1794 annexed by Licciana
 Podenzana, Aulla (1710): Francesco Maria 1712–54
 Pregola, Campi, sotto il Groppo: Corrado 1720–77 (side-branch); Ercole III of Malgrate 1750–97, sold to the Savoia.

 Spino Fiorito:

 Fosdinovo, Gragnola, Castel dell'Aquila: Gabriele III 1722–58, imperial vicary in Italy
 Fabbrica Curone: Antonio Sforza Malaspina 1739–59 (side-branch), sold to the Savoia
 Santa Margherita, Menconico: Francesco Agostino 1749–57; Corrado di Pregola 1720–77 (side-branches)
 Malgrate, Filetto, Godiasco, Oramala, Fortunago, Piumesana: Ercole IV 1750–97, partially sold to the Savoia
 Olivola, Pallerone, Bibola: Giuseppe Massimiliano 1714–58
 Treschietto, Valle, Corlago: Giulio di Filattiera 1710–61 (side-branch), given to Tuscany in 1698
 Sagliano, Godiasco, Piumesana: Francesco 1743–58 (side-branch)
 Grondona (side-branch)
 Valverde, S.Albano, Monfalcone, Godiasco, Piumesana: Carlo Antonio 1704–59 (side-branch)
 Varzi (side-branch), sold to the Savoia
 Verona (side-branch), took over by Venice.

See also 
 Divine Comedy
 Italian nobility

Footnotes

References

Bibliography
 Eugenio Branchi, Storia della Lunigiana feudale, ristampa anastatica, 3 vol., Forni, Bologna 1971.
 Umberto Burla, Malaspina di Lunigiana, Luna editore, La Spezia 2001.
 Giuseppe Caciagli, Storia della Lunigiana, Arnera, Pontedera 1992.
 Giorgio Fiori, I Malaspina, Tip.Le.Co., Piacenza 1995.
 Guido Guagnini, I Malaspina, Il Biscione, Milano 1973.
 Pompeo Litta, Famigli celebri di Italia. Malaspina, 1855. (URL)
 Patrizia Meli, Gabriele Malaspina marchese di Fosdinovo: condotte, politica e diplomazia nella Lunigiana del Rinascimento, University Press, Firenze 2008 , .
 Franco Quartieri, Dante e i Malaspina, in "Analisi e paradossi su 'Commedia' e dintorni", p. 141, Longo editore, Ravenna 2006 .
 Alessandro Soddu (a cura di), I Malaspina e la Sardegna. Documenti e testi dei secoli XII-XIV, CUEC, Cagliari 2005.
 Alessandro Soddu, Struttura familiare e potere territoriale nella signoria dei Malaspina, in "Giornale Storico della Lunigiana e del territorio Lucense", LV (2004), pp. 135–152, 2007.
 Alessandro Soddu, Poteri signorili in Sardegna tra Due e Trecento: i Malaspina, in "RiMe. Rivista dell'Istituto di Storia dell'Europa Mediterranea", 4 (June 2010), pp. 95–105 [Atti del "12th Annual Mediterranean Studies Congress: Sardinia: A Mediterranean Crossroads", Cagliari 27–30 May 2009] on line http://rime.to.cnr.it/
 Alessandro Soddu, "Magni baroni certo e regi quasi". I Malaspina fra Lunigiana, Lucca e Sardegna, in "Acta Historica et Archaelogica Mediaevalia", 30 (2009–2010), pp. 251–260, 2011.

 
Italian noble families
Duchy of Massa and Carrara